St. Mary's Episcopal Church is a parish of the Episcopal Church located at Springfield Center, Otsego County, New York, in the Diocese of Albany. It is known for its historic church, built in 1889, and moved to its present site in 1902.

History
Episcopal worship in the area began in the spring of 1875, when the Rev, E. Folsom Baker, rector of St. Paul’s Church in East Springfield, began holding occasional services. An official mission in Springfield Center was not established until 1889, and the cornerstone for the new church was laid on September 21. The congregation was elevated to a full parish in 1899.

Architecture
The complex also includes the parish hall, the rectory, and the wagon shed.  The fin-de-siècle church building exhibits an unusual combination of Shingle and Gothic Revival styles and designed to evoke the feel of a medieval English chapel. The rectory was built in 1902, and is a two-story, Queen Anne style frame dwelling with a one-story wraparound porch. The parish hall was built in 1910–1911, and is a two-story, Gothic Revival style stuccoed and shingled building that complements the church. The group was added to the National Register of Historic Places in 2015 as St. Mary's Episcopal Church Complex.

References

External links

Religious organizations established in 1889
Episcopal church buildings in New York (state)
Churches on the National Register of Historic Places in New York (state)
Churches completed in 1889
Houses completed in 1902
Queen Anne architecture in New York (state)
Gothic Revival architecture in New York (state)
Churches in Otsego County, New York
National Register of Historic Places in Otsego County, New York